The 1934–35 Cypriot Cup was the first edition of the Cypriot Cup. A total of 8 clubs entered the competition. It began on 4 November 1934 with the quarterfinals and concluded on 25 November 1934 with the replay final which was held at GSP Stadium. Enosis Neon Trust won their 1st Cypriot Cup trophy after beating APOEL 1–0 in the final.

Format 
In the 1934–35 Cypriot Cup, participated all the teams of the Cypriot First Division.

The competition consisted of three knock-out rounds. In all rounds each tie was played as a single leg and was held at the home ground of the one of the two teams, according to the draw results. Each tie winner was qualifying to the next round. If a match was drawn, extra time was following. If extra time was drawn, there was a replay match.

Quarter-finals 
All games took place on 4 November 1934.

Semi-finals 
All games took place on 11 November 1934.

Final 

Because the match ended in a draw after the extra time, a replay match was played.

Sources

Bibliography

See also 
 Cypriot Cup
 1934–35 Cypriot First Division

Cypriot Cup seasons
1934–35 domestic association football cups
1934–35 in Cypriot football